The 1983 World Rally Championship was the 11th season of the Fédération Internationale de l'Automobile (FIA) World Rally Championship (WRC). The season consisted of 12 rallies. By this time, the schedule format had become generally stable, with only one or two changes to venues year to year. 1983 brought the return of Argentina to the schedule in place of Brazil. Audi's Hannu Mikkola beat the defending world champion Walter Röhrl and his Lancia teammate Markku Alén to the drivers' title. Lancia captured the manufacturers' title from Audi by just two points.

Summary

German Walter Röhrl, champion of the previous year despite his manufacturer's failed bid to capture the title, was tapped to drive for the Martini Racing team along with Finn Markku Alén in the new Lancia Rally 037 car. Audi Sport meanwhile carried forward from its successful title run in 1982 led by the same pair of drivers, Finn Hannu Mikkola and Frenchwoman Michèle Mouton, equipped with the Quattro A1 (later in the season upgrading to the A2 model). The team also future champion Swede Stig Blomqvist. Rothmans Opel Rally Team tapped former champion Finn Ari Vatanen and fellow countryman Henri Toivonen to drive the Ascona 400 during the season.

Competition was fierce both for drivers and manufacturers. The works battle quickly centered on the Audi and Lancia, and over the course of the season the two cars won 10 of the 12 events and sit on 30 of the year's 36 podium positions. Lancia emerged on top, returning the manufacturer to glory for the first time since the company seized three consecutive titles in the mid-1970s, despite deciding not to participate in last two events. Audi's performance was impressive and the car was improved in the second half of the season, winning three of the final four events to nearly catch the Italian maker (who, of course, withdrew from two last events, leaving Audi with little competition).

Driver competition was no less intense, with both of the Martini team-mates scoring well through the season. They were outpaced by Mikkola, who was able to garner four wins and seven podiums to take the title by a healthy margin in the end. While Mikkola appeared in all events, Röhrl and Alén only appeared in six and seven events respectively, which gave Mikkola clear path to the title. Mikkola teammate Blomqvist was impressive, finally winning in the last event of the year to place fourth overall, but Mouton's season was a disappointment, her fifth-place finish well off the pace. The Rothmans team meanwhile suffered an unimpressive season, the lone highlight being Vatanen's win in Kenya. This was the team's only podium finish, and Ari himself finished a distant sixth place on the year.

As with previous seasons, while all 12 events were calculated for tallying the drivers' scores, only 10 of the events applied to the championship for manufacturers. The two events in 1983 that applied only to driver standings were Sweden and the Rallye Côte d'Ivoire.

Teams and drivers

Events

Map

Schedule and results

Standings

Drivers' championship

Manufacturers' championship

Pointscoring systems

Drivers' championship

Manufacturers' championship

References

External links

 FIA World Rally Championship 1983 at ewrc-results.com

World Rally Championship
World Rally Championship seasons